Koko (also eko in Yoruba)  is a spicy millet porridge. It is a popular Nigerian and Ghanaian street food and commonly consumed as a breakfast meal. It can also be taken in late afternoon as snack. It is made from millet with a few local spices added to give it a particular taste and color. It is called Hausa koko because of the notion it was created in the Northern areas of Nigeria and  Ghana. It is also common in the various communities in both countries.

Overview 
Hausa koko is mostly found in West African countries and is credited to the Northern people, it is believed to have been first made by the Hausa among whom millet is a dietary staple. It is a very popular Ghanaian street food. On most mornings it is sold on street corners. Sugar, milk and groundnuts are sometimes added to give it a very delicious taste.

Benefits 
Hausa Koko is made from millet which contains Magnesium, Manganese, Tryptophan, Calcium, Fibre and Vitamin B.

Ingredients 

 Millet (Jéró
 Ginger
 Cloves
 Ground dried pepper
 Black peppercorn
 Pinch salt
 pepper

Preparation 

 Wash and soak millet overnight
 Rinse and add ginger,  black peppercorn, dried pepper and blend into a smooth mixture
 Strain twice with fine silk mesh, cover and let set for 5 hours 
 Drain the liquid and set aside
 mix the residue with cold water or drained fermented water and set aside
 Bring about 500 ml water to a boil
 Take off the heat and place on a rack
 add the residue mixture and stir continuously to prevent lumps until the mixture thickens and coats the back of the ladle.
 Hausa koko is ready to serve.
When ready to serve, pour into a bowl, add the desired amount of sugar and stir. For an added touch of luxury, pour in some evaporated milk and groundnut.
it can also be eaten with fried beans dough known as koose or bread.

References

Ghanaian cuisine

Hausa cuisine